The Beautiful Music (TBM) is a Canadian record label started in 2002 by Wally Salem, specializing in indie pop, and inventing Post Mod, and Janglewave music genres. Acts include Skytone, Nick Danger & the Danger City Rebels, The Mules, Jeremy Gluck, Dot Dash, Roy Moller, The Yellow Melodies, The Higher Elevations and The Social Icons.

TBM has gained popularity since 2004 as the label that is releasing a ten volume tribute series to the Television Personalities. The first three volumes are completed with the fourth volume now being compiled.

Discography/Catalogue 
Tremolo - All My Friends EP 2002
Nick Danger & the Danger City Rebels - The Return of Nick Danger EP 2003 
The Mules - Live At The Old Town Hall 2004
Into the Jet Stream of Pop - An International Pop Compilation 2004 
If I Could Write Poetry - A Tribute to the Television Personalities 2004 
The Higher Elevations - Lovestruck EP 2004
Skytone - Echoes in All Directions LP 2005 
Someone to Share My Life With LP Vinyl - The Alternate Tribute to the Television Personalities 2005 (split release with Art Pop Records)
Nick Danger & the Danger City Rebels - Escape from Danger City EP 2006
Would Write a Thousand Words - A Tribute to the Television Personalities Vol. 2 2007 
Jeremy Gluck - This Is 2008 The Barracudas
Armstrong - Songs About the Weather 2009 
The Social Icons - I'm there...you're here 2010 
Dot Dash - Spark>Flame>Ember>Ash 2011
Dot Dash - Winter Garden Light 2012

External links
recordcollectormag.com review
Detour Magazine
Stylus Magazine
HIPCRANK Magazine
San Diego Troubadour

Record labels established in 2002
Canadian independent record labels
Indie pop record labels
2002 establishments in Ontario